The 1924 United States presidential election in New Mexico took place on November 4, 1924. All contemporary forty-eight state were part of the 1924 United States presidential election. State voters chose three electors to represent them in the Electoral College, which voted for President and Vice President. 

New Mexico was won by incumbent Republican President Calvin Coolidge of Massachusetts with 48.5% of the vote, over Democratic West Virginia Congressman John W. Davis's 43%, and Progressive Party Wisconsin U.S. Senator Robert La Follette's 8.5%.

Results

Results by county

Notes

References

1924 New Mexico elections
1924
New Mexico